is a Japanese actor and singer. He began working on television and stage as a child actor. Following his debut as a voice actor in 2002, he currently works with the Super Eccentric Theater Inc. He played Mikado Ryugamine in Durarara!!, Yuri Katsuki in Yuri on Ice,  Shun Matsuoka in Kimi to Boku, Hideyoshi Nagachika in Tokyo Ghoul, Yuuki Tenpouin in Code:Breaker, Mahiro Fuwa in Blast of Tempest, Takeru Totsuka in Kamigami no Asobi and Goshi Kaneshiro in B-Project.

Along with his acting career, Toyanaga has also released a series of indie singles and released his first album, Music of the Entertainment, on April 28, 2014. He later debuted on a major label with the single "Reason" on December 16, 2014, as the theme song to the game Durarara!! Relay.

Biography
Toyonaga was born in Hachiōji, Tokyo, Japan on April 28, 1984.

Filmography

Television

Anime

Original video animation

Films

Video games

Dubbing

Live-action
 Bleeding Steel – Li Sen (Show Lo)
 Spider-Man: Far From Home – Brad Davis (Remy Hii)

Animation
 Link Click – Cheng Xiaoshi/Toki

Drama CD
  – MOMOCHI
 THANATOS NiGHT – Duran
 THANATOS NiGHT Re:Vival – Duran
 Paradox Live – Nayuta Yatanokami

Other
 Kokuhaku Jikkō Iinkai: Ren'ai Series – Minami

Stage
 TenniMu – Kachiro Kato
 Aoharu Tetsudou – Saikyo Line

Discography

Indie Single

Major

Album

References

External links
 Official website 
 Toshiyuki Toyonaga at art sonic 
 Toshiyuki Toyonaga at GamePlaza-Haruka Voice Acting Database 
 Toshiyuki Toyonaga at Hitoshi Doi's Seiyuu Database
 
 

1984 births
Living people
Best Actor Seiyu Award winners
Japanese male child actors
Japanese male film actors
Japanese male musical theatre actors
Japanese male pop singers
Japanese male singer-songwriters
Japanese singer-songwriters
Japanese male television actors
Japanese male video game actors
Japanese male voice actors
Male actors from Tokyo
Seiyu Award winners
Singers from Tokyo
20th-century Japanese male actors
21st-century Japanese male actors
21st-century Japanese singers
21st-century Japanese male singers